Pachymorphus is a genus of beetles in the family Carabidae, containing the following species :

 Pachymorphus adelosioides (Chaudoir, 1878)
 Pachymorphus aereus (Dejean, 1828)
 Pachymorphus chalceus (Dejean, 1828)
 Pachymorphus currens (Brulle, 1838)
 Pachymorphus glaucus (Straneo, 1967)
 Pachymorphus lucidus (Curtis, 1839)
 Pachymorphus moerens (Brulle, 1838)
 Pachymorphus nebrioides (Curtis, 1839)
 Pachymorphus nicki (Emden, 1958)
 Pachymorphus orbignyi (Tschitscherine, 1900)
 Pachymorphus striatulus (Fabricius, 1775)
 Pachymorphus subcorynthius (Straneo, 1967)
 Pachymorphus substriatulus (Straneo, 1967)
 Pachymorphus violaceus (Straneo, 1987)

References

Pterostichinae